Carolina Gomez (born ) is an Argentine female  cyclo-cross cyclist. She represented her nation in the women's elite event at the 2016 UCI Cyclo-cross World Championships  in Heusden-Zolder.

References

1992 births
Living people
Cyclo-cross cyclists
Argentine female cyclists
Place of birth missing (living people)
21st-century Argentine women